The 39th Infantry Regiment was a line infantry regiment of the French Army.

History
It was formed in 1629 as the régiment du baron de Mesle, formed of Belgian recruits. It was renamed the régiment d’Isle-de-France in 1762 then the 39th Line Infantry Regiment in 1791. It was renamed a demi-brigade in 1793 but retained the numeral 39. It resumed its 1791 title in 1803, before being renamed the Légion de la Seine inférieure (1815), then the 1re légion de la Seine inférieure (1819). It resumed its 1791 title yet again in 1820, before that title was simplified to 39th Infantry Regiment in 1882. It was active under that name from 1914 to 1940, 1944 to 1946, 1956 to 1963 and 1964 to 1990, when it was finally disbanded.

Former officers
 Émile Carré
 Pierre Clavel, captain then chef de bataillon to the 39th Demi-Brigade of the 2nd Formation
 Roger Martin du Gard, 1902–1903.
 Césaire Levillain, 1905–1906.
 Roland Dorgelès, volunteered in August 1914, awarded the Croix de guerre.
 Philippe Étancelin, volunteered 1916 to 1919.
 Paul Anquetil
 Georges Scapini
 Pierre de Maismont, Compagnon de la Libération, sous-lieutenant 1933 to 1935

Further reading 

 

Military units and formations of France in World War I
Military units and formations of France in World War II
Infantry regiments of France